The Royal Family of Broadway is a 1930 American pre-Code comedy film directed by George Cukor and Cyril Gardner and released by Paramount Pictures. The screenplay was adapted by Herman J. Mankiewicz and Gertrude Purcell from the play The Royal Family by Edna Ferber and George S. Kaufman. It stars Ina Claire, Fredric March, Mary Brian, Henrietta Crosman, Arnold Korff, and Frank Conroy. It was shot at the Astoria Studios in New York.

The film tells the story of a girl from a family of great Broadway actors who contemplates leaving show business and getting married. The characters are loosely based on the first American theatrical family, the Barrymores. It was nominated for the Academy Award for Best Actor (Fredric March).

A 35mm nitrate print of The Royal Family of Broadway was preserved at the UCLA Film and Television Archive in 1985. The film has not been released on DVD or Blu-Ray. Copyright is held by Universal / MCA.

Cast
Ina Claire as Julie Cavendish
Fredric March as Tony Cavendish
Mary Brian as Gwen Cavendish
Henrietta Crosman as Fanny Cavendish
Charles Starrett as Perry
Arnold Korff as Oscar Wolfe
Frank Conroy as Gilmore Marshall
Royal C. Stout as Joe
Elsie Esmond as Della
Murray Alper as McDermott
Herschel Mayall as Doctor
Lucile Watson as Actress Backstage (uncredited)

References

External links
 

1930 films
American comedy films
1930 comedy films
1930s English-language films
American films based on plays
American black-and-white films
Films directed by George Cukor
Paramount Pictures films
Films with screenplays by Herman J. Mankiewicz
Films directed by Cyril Gardner
Films based on works by Edna Ferber
Films shot at Astoria Studios
1930s American films